Xorides niger is a parasitoid wasp from ichneumonid family that parasitizes long-horned beetles of next species and subspecies: Tetropium castaneum,  Molorchus minor minor.

References

Xoridinae
Insects described in 1913